Andrés Navarro García (born 4 February 1964) is an architect, writer, professor and politician of the Dominican Republic. From 15 September 2014 to 16 August 2016 he was the Minister of Foreign Relations of the Dominican Republic.

Political career 
Andrés Navarro has served as:
 Director de Política Nacional de Desarrollo Urbano, CONAU (Actual DGODT) – 1998 
 Director General de Planeamiento Urbano, Ayuntamiento Distrito Nacional – 2002. 
 Director Adjunto del Programa de Apoyo a la Reforma y Modernización del Estado – PARME – 2005 - 2008.
 Secretario Técnico del Ayuntamiento del Distrito Nacional – 2008 - 2012.
 Secretario General del Ayuntamiento del Distrito Nacional – 2012 - 2014.

Fue Director de Gabinete del Ministerio de Obras Públicas desde abril hasta septiembre del 2014 cuando fue nombrado mediante el decreto presidencial 332-14 Ministro de Relaciones Exteriores de la República Dominicana.

Notes

References

External links 

 

People from Bonao
1964 births
National Autonomous University of Mexico alumni
Universidad Autónoma de Santo Domingo alumni
Dominican Liberation Party politicians
Dominican Republic architects
Dominican Republic urban planners
Foreign ministers of the Dominican Republic
Academic staff of Universidad Autónoma de Santo Domingo
Living people